The Last Shot You Hear is a 1969 British thriller film directed by Gordon Hessler and starring Hugh Marlowe, Zena Walker, Patricia Haines, and William Dysart.

It was Marlowe's last film appearance.

The film marked the end of the association between Robert L. Lippert and 20th Century Fox which produced over 200 films.

Cast
 Hugh Marlowe as Charles Nordeck
 Zena Walker as Eileen Forbes
 Patricia Haines as Anne Nordeck
 William Dysart as Peter Marriott
 Thorley Walters as Gen. Jowett
 Lionel Murton as Rubens
 Joan Young as Mrs. Jowett
 Helen Horton as Dodie Rubens
 John Nettleton as Det. Inspector Nash
 John Wentworth as Chambers
 Alister Williamson as CID Man
 Job Stewart as Policeman
 Julian Holloway as Brash Young Man

Production
The film is based on William Fairchild's play The Sound of Murder which premiered in 1959 in a production starring Peter Cushing and Elizabeth Sellars. The play became a favourite among stock companies.

Filming started November 1967.

It was also known as The Jolly Girls.

The Shaggy Pups wrote the theme song.

Lippert signed Mendel Pups to a two-film deal.

Lippert announced he purchased an original story by Hessler, Genoa. However the film was never made. However, when Lippert and Fox decided to end their relationship the film was not made.

Box Office
According to Fox records the film required $450,000 in rentals to break even and by 11 December 1970 had made $290,000 so made a loss to the studio.

References

External links

The Last Shot You Hear at BFI

1969 films
1960s crime thriller films
20th Century Fox films
British crime thriller films
British films based on plays
Films directed by Gordon Hessler
Lippert Pictures films
1970s English-language films
1960s English-language films
1960s British films
1970s British films